Pseudagrostistachys africana is a species of plant in the family Euphorbiaceae. It is found in Cameroon, Equatorial Guinea, Ghana, Nigeria, and São Tomé and Príncipe. It is threatened by habitat loss.

References

Agrostistachydeae
Vulnerable plants
Taxonomy articles created by Polbot
Taxobox binomials not recognized by IUCN